The Bradford Catholic Girls' Choir was formed in 2006. It has 35 members of girls aged between 10 and 18 from Keighley and Bradford schools under the direction of Thomas Leech. It is part of the Leeds Diocese Schools Singing Programme, the largest choir outreach programme in Britain.

The girls have performed twice at the Llangollen International Musical Eisteddfod, finishing 5th in 2009 as the highest-placed UK choir. The choir was awarded the Music for Youth Senior choirs' award for their outstanding musicianship in Birmingham in July 2009.

The girls have appeared on Songs of Praise on the BBC as well as numerous radio performances. Together with the Bradford Catholic Boys' Choir, the choir has recorded a CD, Jubilate Deo.

The choir performed several concerts in France in June 2008, performing in Paris and Lourdes and again in France at the 9èmes Rencontres Internationales de Choeurs d'Enfants Festival in April 2010. In July 2014, they will compete in the World Choir Games, held in Riga, Latvia.

References

Sources 
Diocese of leeds, Music department

External links
 The Diocese of Leeds Music Department

Musical groups from West Yorkshire
Yorkshire choirs
Organisations based in Bradford
2006 establishments in England
Musical groups established in 2006
Girls' and women's choirs